KFNF (101.1 FM, "Today's Best Country") is a radio station licensed to serve Oberlin, Kansas.The station is owned by Armada Media Corporation and licensed to Armada Media - McCook, Inc. It airs a Country format.

References

External links
 

FNF
Country radio stations in the United States